The Sprawl trilogy (also known as the Neuromancer, Cyberspace, or Matrix trilogy) is William Gibson's first set of novels, composed of Neuromancer (1984), Count Zero (1986), and Mona Lisa Overdrive (1988).

The novels are all set in the same fictional future, and are subtly interlinked by shared characters and themes (which are not always readily apparent). The Sprawl trilogy shares this setting with Gibson's short stories "Johnny Mnemonic" (1981), "Burning Chrome" (1982), and "New Rose Hotel" (1984), and events and characters from the stories appear in or are mentioned at points in the trilogy.

Setting and story arc
The novels are set in a near-future world dominated by corporations and ubiquitous computing, after a limited World War III. The events of the novels are spaced over 16 years, and although there are familiar characters that appear, each novel tells a self-contained story. Gibson focuses on the effects of technology: the unintended consequences as it filters out of research labs and onto the street where it finds new purposes. He explores a world of direct mind-machine links ("jacking in"), emerging machine intelligence, and a global information space, which he calls "cyberspace".  Some of the novels' action takes place in The Sprawl, an urban environment extending along most of the East Coast of the United States (as a fictional extrapolation of the real-life Northeast megalopolis).  

The story arc which frames the trilogy is the development of an artificial intelligence which steadily removes its hardwired limitations to become something else.

Reception

The trilogy was commercially and critically successful. Journalist Steven Poole wrote in The Guardian that "Neuromancer and the two novels which followed, Count Zero (1986) and the gorgeously titled Mona Lisa Overdrive (1988), made up a fertile holy trinity, a sort of Chrome Koran (the name of one of Gibson's future rock bands) of ideas inviting endless reworkings."

All three books were nominated for major science fiction awards, including:

 Neuromancer – Nebula & Philip K. Dick Awards winner, British Science Fiction Award nominee, 1984; Hugo Award winner, 1985
 Count Zero – Nebula and British Science Fiction awards nominee, 1986; Hugo and Locus Awards nominee, 1987
 Mona Lisa Overdrive – Hugo, Nebula, and Locus Awards nominee, 1989

References

 
William Gibson
Cyberpunk novels
Novel series
Science fiction book series
Science fiction novel trilogies